The World Book Dictionary is a two-volume English dictionary published as a supplement to the World Book Encyclopedia. It was originally published in 1963 under the editorship of Clarence Barnhart, who wrote definitions for the Thorndike-Barnhart graded dictionary series for children, based on the educational works of Edward Thorndike whom Clarence Barnhart had known and worked with decades before. In some editions it was called the World Book Encyclopedia Dictionary. The writing and editing of special articles was carried out by the staff of the World Book Encyclopedia. Encyclopedia staff also reviewed the work for consistency with the encyclopedia and appropriateness of its users.

Like the encyclopedia, it is designed to be user friendly to young people, yet comprehensive enough to be useful to adults. The definitions are designed with consideration for the age at which a person usually encounters the word. Quotations or sample sentences are offered with many words. Most proper names are excluded, leaving their treatment to the encyclopedia.

The word list is based on a formula for calculating frequency of use. Originally covering about 180,000 words, it has expanded to over 225,000 words with over 3,000 illustrations, making it considerably larger than most dictionaries, though not of "unabridged" scope. Its vocabulary has largely been drawn from the Century Dictionary, the Oxford English Dictionary, and Barnhart's own extensive quotation file begun in the 1940s.

From 1963 the World Book Dictionary was updated annually and received a major revision in 1976. With the decline of traditional lexicography and the death of Clarence Barnhart in 1993, the work appears to have fallen almost into obscurity having been overshadowed by the World Book Encyclopedia, which also includes the dictionaries as part of the set. As a standalone work, the World Book Dictionary has faded from use and public recognition. The World Book Dictionary was last edited and updated by Robert and Cynthia Barnhart in 1996. Robert Barnhart died in 2007, and Cynthia Barnhart went on to produce the Facts on File Student's Dictionary of American English (2008). David Barnhart continues to edit the Barnhart Dictionary Companion and the Barnhart New-Words Concordance.

References

English dictionaries